Javier Gómara (7 January 1927 – 12 February 2022) was a Spanish politician who served as a Deputy.

References

1927 births
2022 deaths
20th-century Spanish politicians
21st-century Spanish politicians
Navarrese People's Union politicians
Members of the 2nd Congress of Deputies (Spain)
Members of the 1st Parliament of Navarre
Presidents of the Parliament of Navarre
Politicians from Navarre